E68 may refer to:
 European route E68, a road
 A Fianchetto variation of the King's Indian Defence, Encyclopaedia of Chess Openings code
 Chūō Expressway Kawaguchiko Route and Higashifuji-goko Road, route E68 in Japan
 Estrella Sailport, a privately-owned public use airport in the U.S.A.